Josu de Solaun (born October 27, 1981) is a Spanish-American classical music pianist. He is also a solo piano free improviser, playing solo improvised piano recitals, as well as a published poet and a published composer. He holds citizenships from both Spain and the United States. In 2019 he was given the title of Officer of Cultural Merit, a state decoration, by Klaus Iohannis, president of Romania. In 2021 he was awarded an International Classical Music Awards (ICMA) Award.

Biography 
He is winner of the First Prize at the XIII George Enescu International Piano Competition, the First Prize at the I European Union Piano Competition held in Prague, and the First Grand Prize at the XV José Iturbi International Piano Competition. He is the first and only pianist from Spain to have ever been awarded the coveted prizes in the more than 30 and 50 years of their existence (the Iturbi and Enescu Competitions, founded in 1981 and 1958).  From 1999 to 2019 he resided in the United States, until 2014 in New York City, and is a graduate of the Manhattan School of Music, from which he holds a Bachelor of Music, Master of Music and Doctorate in Musical Arts, and where his main teachers were Nina Svetlanova and Horacio Gutiérrez. He studied chamber music with violinist Isidore Cohen. From 2014 to 2018 he was Professor of Piano at Sam Houston State University. Since 2019 he resides in Madrid, Spain.
 In Spain, until the age of 17, his main teacher was Mexican pianist Maria Teresa Naranjo Ochoa.

He has performed as a soloist with orchestras such as the Spanish National Orchestra, Mariinsky Theatre Orchestra, Moscow Chamber Orchestra, Philharmonic Orchestra of Fenice, George Enescu Philharmonic Orchestra, National Symphony Orchestra of Colombia, RTÉ Concert Orchestra, Ploiești Philharmonic Orchestra, Transylvania State Philharmonic Orchestra, Janáček Philharmonic Orchestra, Moravian Philharmonic, Mexico City Philharmonic Orchestra, RTVE Symphony Orchestra, Moldova State Philharmonic Orchestra, Banatul Philharmonic of Timișoara, Orquesta Sinfónica de Galicia, Orquesta de Valencia, City of Granada Orchestra, Orquesta Filarmónica de Málaga, Bilbao Orkestra Sinfonikoa, Sioux City Symphony Orchestra, and under conductors such as Justus Frantz, Rumon Gamba, Gheorghe Costin, JoAnn Falletta, Constantine Orbelian, Ilarion Ionescu-Galaţi, Christian Badea, Theodore Kuchar, Paul Daniel, Enrique García Asensio, Jean-Claude Casadesus, Laurence Equilbey, Rossen Milanov, Yaron Traub, Alexis Soriano, Miguel Ángel Gómez Martínez and Ramón Tebar.

Recordings 
He has recorded for Naxos Records, Audite, and IBS Classical, including the complete works for piano by George Enescu.

Prizes

References

External links 
 Official Website
 Josu De Solaun, la revolución paradigmática. 
 Youtube Channel
 Poetry Publishing House Edictoralia
 Article in Czech about the I EU Piano Competition
 Article from Mariinsky Theatre Web Page
 Article from Enescu Festival 2014 Web Page
 Article about poetry

Living people
1981 births
Manhattan School of Music alumni
Spanish classical pianists
Male classical pianists
José Iturbi International Piano Competition prize-winners
21st-century classical pianists
21st-century American male musicians
Spanish emigrants to the United States
Spanish people of Basque descent
People from Valencia
Musicians from New York City
Spanish male musicians